"Fallen Angel" is a song by Norwegian singer Tix. He represented Norway in the Eurovision Song Contest in Rotterdam and progressed to the grand final. The song is an English translation of the song "Ut av mørket" ("Out of the darkness"), which he performed on the first semi-final of Melodi Grand Prix 2021, and was released on 15 January 2021. The song peaked at number 2 on the VG-lista chart. On 20 February 2021, Tix performed the song under the English title "Fallen Angel" and won the final of Melodi Grand Prix 2021. "Fallen Angel" was released the same day.

Background
The song is about struggling with depression, that is made even worse by being rejected by a girl who Tix had feelings for. Tix compares depression to "fighting with demons inside a hole in my heart" in the song.

Eurovision Song Contest

The song was selected to represent Norway in the Eurovision Song Contest 2021, after Tix was selected through Melodi Grand Prix 2021, the music competition that selects Norway's entries for the Eurovision Song Contest. The semi-finals of the 2021 contest featured the same line-up of countries as determined by the draw for the 2020 contest's semi-finals. Norway was placed into the first semi-final, which was held on 18 May 2021, and performed in the second half of the show.

Track listing

Charts

Weekly charts

Year-end charts

References

2021 songs
2021 singles
English-language Norwegian songs
Eurovision songs of 2021
Eurovision songs of Norway
Melodi Grand Prix songs of 2021
Number-one singles in Norway
Universal Music Group singles